The 1986 Country Music Association Awards, 20th Ceremony, was held on October 13, 1986, at the Grand Ole Opry House, Nashville, Tennessee, and was hosted by CMA Award winners Kenny Rogers and Anne Murray.

Winners and nominees 
Winner are in Bold.

Hall of Fame

References 

Country Music Association
CMA
Country Music Association Awards
Country Music Association Awards
Country Music Association Awards
Country Music Association Awards
20th century in Nashville, Tennessee
Events in Nashville, Tennessee